The 8th Canadian Film Awards were held on August 6, 1956 to honour achievements in Canadian film. The ceremony was hosted by actor Maurice Evans.

Winners
Film of the Year: Not awarded
Theatrical Feature Length: Not awarded
Theatrical Short: Gold — National Film Board of Canada, Tom Daly producer, Colin Low director 
Honorable Mention: The Shepherd — Julian Biggs producer and director
Special Mention: The Jolifou Inn — National Film Board of Canada, Tom Daly producer, Colin Low director 
TV Information: Saskatchewan Traveller — National Film Board of Canada, Grant McLean producer, Don Haldane director
Honorable Mention: Monkey on the Back — National Film Board of Canada, Grant McLean producer, Julian Biggs director
Honorable Mention: L'Alpinisme — National Film Board of Canada, Guy Glover producer, Rollo Gamble director
Non-Theatrical Open: The Colour of Life — National Film Board of Canada, J.V. Durden producer and director
Honorable Mention: Les Aboiteaux (The Dikes) — National Film Board of Canada, Roger Blais
Special Mention: Face of Saskatchewan — Crawley Films, F.R. Crawley and J. Stanley Moore producers
Non-Theatrical, Government Sponsored: First Aid for Aircrew — National Film Board of Canada, David Bairstow producer, Walford Hewitson director  
Honorable Mention: Huff & Puff — National Film Board of Canada, Frank Spiller producer, Graham Crabtree director
Special Mention: Identity — Nova Scotia Film Bureau, Margaret Perry director
Special Mention: Harvest in the Valley — National Film Board of Canada, Larry Gosnell producer and director
Non-Theatrical, Non-Government Sponsored: Not awarded
Honorable Mention: Miracle of the Bees — Carey Studios
Honorable Mention: Sibling Relations and Personality — Crawley Films, Stanley Jackson producer and director
Special Mention: The Revolution Is Now — Crawley Films, Peter Cock producer and director
Special Mention: Jamboree — Chetwynd Films, Arthur Chetwynd producer
Amateur: Calgary Stampede — Jack W. Ruddell director
Honorable Mention: Fox Hunting in Canada — Walter Lynch director
Honorable Mention: Mexico - Land of Contrast — Norman Cowan and George Herman directors
Special Mention: Experiment in Animation — Donna Martinez

References

Canadian
08
1956 in Canada